The arrondissement of Strasbourg-Ville is a former arrondissement of France in the Bas-Rhin department in the Alsace region. In 2015 it was merged into the new arrondissement of Strasbourg. It had 1 commune, and its population was 274,394 (2012).

Composition

The only commune of the arrondissement of Strasbourg-Ville was Strasbourg (INSEE code 67482).

History

The arrondissement of Strasbourg-Ville was created in 1919. It was disbanded in 2015. As a result of the reorganisation of the cantons of France which came into effect in 2015, the borders of the cantons are no longer related to the borders of the arrondissements. The cantons of the arrondissement of Strasbourg-Ville were, as of January 2015:
 Strasbourg 1st Canton
 Strasbourg 2nd Canton
 Strasbourg 3rd Canton
 Strasbourg 4th Canton
 Strasbourg 5th Canton
 Strasbourg 6th Canton
 Strasbourg 7th Canton
 Strasbourg 8th Canton
 Strasbourg 9th Canton
 Strasbourg 10th Canton

References

Strasbourg-Ville